The 1995–96 Bulgarian Cup was the 56th season of the Bulgarian Cup. Slavia Sofia won the competition, beating Levski Sofia in the final at the Vasil Levski National Stadium in Sofia.

First round

|-
!colspan=3 style="background-color:#D0F0C0;" |7 November 1995

|-
!colspan=3 style="background-color:#D0F0C0;" |8 November 1995

|}

Second round

|-
!colspan=5 style="background-color:#D0F0C0;" |29 November / 9, 16 December 1995

|}

Quarter-finals

|-
!colspan=5 style="background-color:#D0F0C0;" |5, 6 / 20 March 1996

|}

Semi-finals

|-
!colspan=5 style="background-color:#D0F0C0;" |3 / 17 April 1996

|}

Final

Details

References

1995-96
1995–96 domestic association football cups
Cup